Ali Ölmez (born August 21, 1983) is a Turkish footballer. He currently plays as a winger for Buca Belediyespor.

References

 

1983 births
Adana Demirspor footballers
Altay S.K. footballers
Altınordu F.K. players
MKE Ankaragücü footballers
Living people
Turkish footballers
Footballers from İzmir
Süper Lig players
Association football midfielders